John Michael Cullen (14 December 1927 – 23 March 2001) was an Australian ornithologist, of English origin. Mike Cullen began his academic career by studying mathematics at Wadham College, Oxford, but later switched to zoology, spending time at the Edward Grey Institute of Field Ornithology while investigating the ecology of marsh tits.  He subsequently achieved his PhD with Niko Tinbergen with a study of the behaviour of the common tern on the Farne Islands off the coast of Northumberland.

In 1976 he moved to Australia, to Monash University in Melbourne, Victoria.  There he was involved in an investigation of Abbott's booby on Christmas Island which was threatened by phosphate mining.  He served on the Field Investigation Committee of the Royal Australasian Ornithologists Union (RAOU) for which he organised the Rolling Bird Survey project.  However, he is best known for long-term studies of the little penguin at Phillip Island and in Port Phillip Bay at St Kilda, in collaboration with Pauline Reilly and others.

References
 Dann, Peter. (2002). Obituary. Professor J. Michael (Mike) Cullen, 14 December 1927 - 23 March 2001. VWSG Bulletin 25: 92–93.
 Robin, Libby. (2001). The Flight of the Emu: a hundred years of Australian ornithology 1901-2001. Carlton, Vic. Melbourne University Press.

External links
 For a Eulogy by Richard Dawkins see http://richarddawkins.net/article,2623,Tribute-to-a-Beloved-Mentor,Richard-Dawkins
 John Krebs and Richard Dawkins, Obituary in Guardian

1927 births
2001 deaths
Cullen, Mike
Cullen, Mike
Academic staff of Monash University
20th-century British zoologists
Alumni of Wadham College, Oxford
British emigrants to Australia